Wadsworth's cipher, or  Wheatstone's cipher, was a cipher invented by Decius Wadsworth, a Colonel in the United States Army Ordnance Corps. In 1817, he developed a progressive cipher system based on a 1790 design by Thomas Jefferson, establishing a method that was continuously improved upon and used until the end of World War II.

Wadsworth's system involved a set of two disks, one inside the other, where the outer disk had the 26 letters of the alphabet and the numbers 2-8, and the inner disk had only the 26 letters. The disks were geared together at a ratio of 26:33.  To encipher a message, the inner disk was turned until the desired letter was at the top position, with the number of turns required for the result transmitted as ciphertext. Due to the gearing, a ciphertext substitution for a character did not repeat until all 33 characters for the plaintext letter had been used. A similar device was invented by Charles Wheatstone several years after Wadsworth.

References
"A Short History of Cryptography", Fred Cohen, 1995
"Cryptography Primer", Jose Mari Reyes, 2001
"Cryptography Timeline", Carl Ellison, December 11, 2004
Codes, Richard A. Mollin, 2005

Classical ciphers